Schistophila laurocistella is a moth of the family Gelechiidae. It is found in Morocco, Portugal, Spain and southern France.

The wingspan is 6–7 mm.

The larvae feed on Cistus species, including Cistus laurifolius. They mine the leaves of their host plant. The mine starts as a corridor at a brown spot near the petiole, following the leaf margin and widening into a blotch at the leaf tip. From there, a branch extends back into the blade.

References

Moths described in 1899
Litini